Caira County is one of the 141 Cadastral divisions of New South Wales. It contains the city of Balranald. It is located between where the Murrumbidgee River joins the Murray River to where the Lachlan River joins the Murrumbidgee, containing much of the western Lowbidgee Floodplain.  The name "Caira" is believed to derive from a local Aboriginal word.

Parishes within this county
A full list of parishes found within this county; their current LGA and mapping coordinates to the approximate centre of each location is as follows:

References

Counties of New South Wales